Nile University (NUU) is a privately owned institution of higher education in Uganda. It is accredited and licensed by the Uganda National Council for Higher Education (UNCHE).

Location
The geographical location of the temporary campus of Nile University are: 03°04'11.0"N, 30°56'15.0"E (Latitude:3.069722; Longitude:30.937500).

This where the university plans to relocate the main campus in the future.

History
Nile University opened its doors to its first cohort of 53 students on 24 August 2003. All freshmen undergraduates are required to take a foundation year of English, Mathematics, Computer Studies and Ethics. The university was established to meet the huge need for higher education, research and human development in the West Nile sub-region.

Academics
The university is organised into three faculties; (a) Faculty of Agriculture (b) Faculty of Business Administration and Management and (c) Faculty of Education.

Courses
As of May 2018, the following academic courses are offered at Nile University in Uganda:
 Postgraduate courses
 Master's Degree in Health Services Management 
 Postgraduate Diploma in Health Services Management
 Undergraduate degree courses
 Bachelor of Business Administration and Management 
 Bachelor of Ethics and Development Studies 
 Bachelor of Agricultural Economics and Agribusiness Management
 Bachelor of Agricultural Entrepreneurship
 Bachelor of Primary Education
 Undergraduate diploma courses
The following undergraduate diploma courses are offered at the university
 Diploma in Human Resource Management
 Diploma in Business Administration and Management
 Diploma in Health Service Management
 Diploma in Project Planning and Management
 Diploma in Public Administration and Management.

See also
 List of Business Schools in Uganda
 List of universities in Uganda
 Education in Uganda

References

External links
 Website of Nile University Uganda
 West Nile District Leaders Disagree Over 100 Million For Nile University As of 14 April 2009.
 Learning source at the Nile As of 14 November 2003.
 Uganda looks north for new university As of 1 August 2003.

Universities and colleges in Uganda
Educational institutions established in 2003
Arua
Arua District
West Nile sub-region
Business schools in Uganda
2003 establishments in Uganda